Chris Kuete (born 1983 in Cameroon) is a Cameroonian professional basketball player in the Asean Basketball League currently playing as an import for the Chang Thailand Slammers. He previously played for numerous teams in the Malaysia National Basketball League, the most recent being Red Bull Barako.  He was directly taken by Kuala Lumpur Dragons in 2009.

Player Profile

Kuete is a guard who started his MNBL career with the Klang WCT Land BC. He was most notable for winning the 2007 Overall Champions and Most Valuable Players award with Klang WCT Land BC. He was traded to HiTech Basketball Club in Thailand.

He played for the Kuala Lumpur Dragons during the first season of the ASEAN Basketball League. For his second season, he was recruited by the Chang Thailand Slammers and won the playoffs defeating the Philippine Patriots in the finals. He is already committed to defend the title with the Slammers the next season.

Awards
 Malaysia National Basketball League Most Valuable Players: 2007 (with Klang WCT Land BC)2009 (with Bintulu Rainbow BC)
 Thailand Open: 2008 (with HiTech Basketball Club)

External links
 Chris Kuete's profile in Kuala Lumpur Dragons Official Website

References 

1984 births
Living people
Cameroonian men's basketball players
Point guards
Shooting guards
Kuala Lumpur Dragons players